Amphisbaena uroxena is a species of worm lizard found in Brazil.

References

uroxena
Reptiles described in 2008
Taxa named by Tami Mott
Taxa named by Miguel Trefaut Rodrigues
Taxa named by Marco A. de Freitas
Taxa named by Marcio Borba da Silva
Endemic fauna of Brazil
Reptiles of Brazil